James DeMonaco (born October 12, 1969) is an American screenwriter, director, and producer. He is best known for creating the Purge franchise, writing all five films in the series and directing the first three, The Purge (2013), Anarchy (2014), and Election Year (2016).

DeMonaco's first produced screenplay was the Robin Williams comedy Jack (1996), directed by Francis Ford Coppola.

Personal life 
DeMonaco grew up in Brooklyn and Staten Island. He spent eight years in Paris, France, that led him to "put a microscope" on his life after seeing the difference in the relationship toward guns and violence in Paris compared to New York. DeMonaco is of Italian descent.

He and his wife, a doctor, were almost killed by a drunk driver in Brooklyn. In anger, his wife said "I wish we could all have one free one [a murder] a year", something which helped inspire the Purge series.

Filmography

Film

Television

References

External links

Living people
1969 births
American film directors
American male screenwriters
American male actors
American film producers
American television producers
American television writers
American male television writers
Horror film directors
American writers of Italian descent
American people of Italian descent